Trefný is a Czech surname. Notable people with the surname include: 

 Jakub Trefný (born 1981), Czech ice hockey player
 Radovan Trefný (born 1987), Slovak ice hockey player
 Otto Trefný (1932–2019), Czech medical doctor and politician

Czech-language surnames